Duas Igrejas is a Portuguese parish of the municipality of Paredes. The population in 2011 was 3,879, in an area of 3.78 km².

References

Freguesias of Paredes, Portugal